Jore Trompet (born 30 July 1992) is a Belgian footballer who currently plays for KSV Temse.

Honours
Lokeren
Belgian Cup: 2013–14

References

External links
 
 
 

1992 births
Living people
Belgian footballers
Belgium youth international footballers
K.S.C. Lokeren Oost-Vlaanderen players
K.V.C. Westerlo players
Belgian Pro League players
Footballers from Brussels
Association football midfielders